is the debut studio album by Japanese singer Ado, released January 26, 2022, by Virgin Music. A J-pop and rock record, the album was produced by various Vocaloid musicians.

Upon its release, Kyōgen was commercially successful within Japan. The album debuted and peaked at number one on the Oricon Combined Albums Chart, Oricon Albums Chart and the Billboard Japan Hot Albums chart.

Background 
Ado, the pseudonym of a Japanese singer, signed with Virgin Music in 2020, at the age of 17. She released her debut single "Usseewa", which became popular among the Japanese youth. Despite being released digitally, "Usseewa" peaked at number one on the Billboard Japan Hot 100, and number 41 on the Billboard Global 200. Reaching 100 million streams after its 17th week on the chart, Ado became the sixth person in history to achieve this. She also became the youngest solo artist to reach 100 million streams. Later that year, she released her second single, "Readymade".

In January 2022, Universal Music Japan announced Ado's debut studio album would be released later that month. Universal Japan announced six new songs would be on the album, along with Ado's previous digital singles. "Kokoro to iu Na no Fukakai" was released as a promotional single prior to the release of the album on January 17, 2022.

Promotion 
Seven songs from Kyōgen were used in commercial tie-ins. "Readymade" was used as the ending theme for Abema's AbemaPrime. "Odo" was used by NHK in a program in promotion of Vocaloid. "Aitakute" was used as an insert song for the Japanese film Kaguya-sama Final: Love Is War. "Ashura-chan" served as the theme song for TV Asahi's drama, Doctor-X: Surgeon Michiko Daimon. "Kokoro to iu Na no Fukakai" was used as theme song for Kantele and Fuji TV's drama, Doctor White. TBS Television used "Motherland" as the theme song for the 2022 Winter Olympics. "Yoru no Pierrot" additionally was used as an opening theme song for a Japanese drama series.

Commercial performance 
Kyōgen scored 163,052 points in its first week, debuting at number one on the Oricon Combined Albums Chart. It sold 142,041 physical copies in its first week, debuting at number one on the Oricon Albums Chart. The album also debuted at the top spot both on Billboard Japan Hot Albums chart and Oricon Digital Albums chart. Kyōgen became the first debut studio album to debut and peak at number one by a female solo artist in 10 years, the previous being Japanese singer Miwa's 2011 studio album, Guitarissimo. The album was also the first to sell over 100,000 copies in its first week by a female artist since Superfly's self titled debut album.

Track listing 

Notes

 English and Hepburn romanization track titles adapted from Tidal.
 "Freedom" is stylized in all upper case lettering.
 "Kokoro to iu Na no Fukakai" is stylized as "KokoroToIuNaNoFukakai" on digital stores.

Personnel 
Credits adapted from Tidal and album liner notes.

Musicians 

Malo – bass
Koji Shinnai – guitar
Tsubasa Takada – string arrangement
Tatsuya Kitani – bass
Yumao – drums
Zenko Mitsuya – guitar
Ado – vocals
Three – production, songwriting
Giga – production, songwriting
TeddyLoid – production, songwriting
Decco27 – songwriting
Kanaria – production, songwriting
Jon-Yakitory – production, songwriting
Whale Don't Sleep – production, songwriting
Mewhan – production, songwriting
Mikito P – production
Hiiragikirai – production, songwriting
Teniwoha – production, songwriting
Neru – production, songwriting
Mafumafu – production, songwriting
Syudou – production, songwriting
Nilefruits – production, songwriting
Ine – production, songwriting
Biz – production, songwriting

Technical 

Kenichi Koga – immersive mix engineering
Three – recording arrangement
Giga – recording arrangement, mastering
TeddyLoid – recording arrangement
Naoki Itai – mixing
Vis – mixing
Mikito P – recording arrangement
Hiiragikirai – recording arrangement, mixing
Teniwoha – recording arrangement
Neru – vocal arrangement
Syudou – recording arrangement
Ine – recording arrangement
Biz – recording arrangement
Tsubasa Yamazaki  – mastering
Kenji Yoshino  – mastering

Visuals and imagery 

 Orihara – art direction, illustrator
 Jun Hirota – graphic design
 Shiho Katsuno – graphic design

Charts

Weekly charts

Monthly charts

Year-end charts

Certifications

Release history

References 

2022 debut albums
Ado (singer) albums
Virgin Records albums
Universal Music Japan albums
Universal Music Group albums